Cyclodinus is a genus of antlike flower beetles in the family Anthicidae. There are more than 40 described species in Cyclodinus.

Species
These 48 species belong to the genus Cyclodinus:

 Cyclodinus angustulus (Pic, 1892)
 Cyclodinus annectens (LeConte, 1851)
 Cyclodinus ataensis (Pic, 1901)
 Cyclodinus basanicus (Sahlberg, 1913)
 Cyclodinus bicarinula (De Marseul, 1879)
 Cyclodinus blandulus (Baudi, 1877)
 Cyclodinus bremei (La Ferté-Sénectère, 1842)
 Cyclodinus brivioi Bucciarelli, 1962
 Cyclodinus californicus (LaFerté-Sénectère, 1849)
 Cyclodinus cerastes (Truqui, 1855)
 Cyclodinus coniceps (Marseul, 1879)
 Cyclodinus croissandeaui (Pic, 1893)
 Cyclodinus debilis (La Ferte-Senectere, 1849)
 Cyclodinus dentatus (Pic, 1895)
 Cyclodinus desbrochersi (Pic, 1893)
 Cyclodinus dimidiatus (Wollaston, 1864)
 Cyclodinus erro (Truqui, 1855)
 Cyclodinus fancelloi Degiovanni, 2015
 Cyclodinus fatuus (Truqui, 1855)
 Cyclodinus forticornis (Pic, 1893)
 Cyclodinus franciscanus (Casey, 1895)
 Cyclodinus humilis (Germar, 1824)
 Cyclodinus incomptus (Truqui, 1855)
 Cyclodinus italicus (Pic, 1901)
 Cyclodinus kryzhanovskii Blinstein, 1988
 Cyclodinus larvipennis (Marseul, 1879)
 Cyclodinus longipilis (C.Brisout de Barneville, 1863)
 Cyclodinus lotus (De Marseul, 1879)
 Cyclodinus lucidicollis (De Marseul, 1879)
 Cyclodinus maltzevi Blinstein, 1988
 Cyclodinus mediobrunneus (Pic, 1893)
 Cyclodinus mimus (Casey, 1895)
 Cyclodinus minutus (La Ferté-Sénectère, 1842)
 Cyclodinus misoloughii (Pic, 1893)
 Cyclodinus moltonii Bucciarelli, 1961
 Cyclodinus mono Chandler, 2005
 Cyclodinus montandoni (Pic, 1909)
 Cyclodinus mundulus (Sharp, 1885)
 Cyclodinus paiute Chandler, 2005
 Cyclodinus reitteri (Pic, 1892)
 Cyclodinus roberti (Pic, 1892)
 Cyclodinus salinus (Crotch, 1867)
 Cyclodinus sareptanus (Pic, 1893)
 Cyclodinus sauteri (Pic, 1913)
 Cyclodinus semiopacus (Reitter, 1887)
 Cyclodinus sibiricus Pic, 1893
 Cyclodinus thessalius (De Marseul, 1879)
 Cyclodinus ustulatus (La Ferte-Senectere, 1849)

References

Further reading

 
 

Anthicidae
Articles created by Qbugbot